Butterfly  is a 2009 young adult fiction novel by Sonya Hartnett about the troubled adolescence of Plum Coyle, set in 1980s Australian suburbia. The Blurb is; Plum Coyle is on the edge of adolescence. Her fourteenth birthday is approaching, when her old life and her old body will fall away, and she will become graceful, powerful, and at ease. The strength of the objects she stores in a briefcase under her bed —a crystal lamb, a yoyo, an antique watch, a coin —will make sure of it. Over the next couple of weeks, Plum’s life will change. Her beautiful neighbor Maureen will begin to show Plum how she might fly. The older brothers she adores will court catastrophe in worlds that she barely knows exist. And her friends, her worst enemies, will tease and test, smelling weakness. They will try to lead her on and take her down.

Awards and nominations
 2009 shortlisted The Age Book of the Year Award — Fiction Prize 
 2009 highly commended The Fellowship of Australian Writers Victoria Inc. National Literary Awards — FAW Christina Stead Award 
 2009 shortlisted Colin Roderick Award
 2010 shortlisted Miles Franklin Literary Award

2009 Australian novels
Australian young adult novels
Novels by Sonya Hartnett
Novels set in Australia
Fiction set in the 1980s
Hamish Hamilton books